The bamboo bats are genus of vesper bats in the genus Tylonycteris. The name translates as "padded bat", and refers to the presence of hairless fleshy pads on the hands and feet, which the bats use to help them grip onto bamboo.

The species within this genus are:

 Blyth's bamboo bat, Tylonycteris fulvida
 Malayan bamboo bat, Tylonycteris malayana
 Lesser bamboo bat, Tylonycteris pachypus
 Pygmy bamboo bat, Tylonycteris pygmaeus
 Greater bamboo bat, Tylonycteris robustula
 Tonkin bamboo bat, Tylonycteris tonkinensis

References

D.E. Wilson & D.M. Reeder, 2005: Mammal Species of the World: A Taxonomic and Geographic Reference. Third Edition. The Johns Hopkins University Press, Baltimore

 
Bat genera
Taxa named by Wilhelm Peters